Abraham Holzmann (19 August 1874 – 16 January 1939) was an American composer, famous for his march Blaze-Away!

Abraham Holzmann was born in New York City. His parents were Jacob Holzmann, a Hungarian-Jewish immigrant and Isabella Holzmann, a native of Louisiana. The young Holzmann learned music in Germany. A review originally published by the New York Herald on Sunday, 13 January 1901, entitled German Composer who Writes American Cakewalk Music describes "[h]is knowledge of bass and counterpoint is thorough, and his standard compositions bear the stamp of harmonic lore, which makes his proclivity for the writing of the popular style of music the more remarkable."

Abe married Isabelle Fishblatt  around 1908, and he became the manager of the Orchestra Department at Jerome Remick & Company, music publisher in New York.
He was an early member (1923) of the American Society of Composers, Authors and Publishers (ASCAP). He earned his livelihood as composer/arranger for Tin Pan Alley publishers, including Leo Feist. He later was advertising manager for the  American Federation of Musicians publication, International Musician. He was a member of Freemasonry, the Elks, and Knights of Pythias, all in New York City.

Holzmann died in East Orange, New Jersey at age 64. He was survived by his widow, a daughter Natalie Holzmann, three half-brothers, and four sisters. His music was especially revered by ragtime enthusiasts, although he composed marches, waltzes, and other light music.

His 1899 composition Smokey Mokes was briefly featured in the 1936 movie San Francisco.

Works
 A-la-carte (1915)
 Alagazam (1902)
 Blaze-Away! (1901)  possibly a tribute to "Rough Rider" turned U.S. President Theodore Roosevelt
 Bunch O' Blackberries (1899)
 Calanthe (1900)
 Cowperthwait Centennial March (1907)
 Flying Arrow (1906)
 The Hand That Rocks The Cradle Rules The World (1901)
 Hunky Dory (1900)
 Love-Land (1905)
 Old Faithful (1908)
 The Rialto (1916)
 Smokey Mokes (1899)
 Spirit of Independence (1912)
 Symphia (1902)
 Uncle Sammy (1904)
 The Whip (1908)
 The Winning Fight (1911)
 Yankee Grit (1905)

See also
 List of ragtime composers

References

External links

1874 births
1939 deaths
American male composers
American composers
German composers
Ragtime composers
American people of Hungarian-Jewish descent